Rick Yves Confiance (born May 24, 1994) is a Seychellois weightlifter. He placed 13th in the men's 62 kg event at the 2016 Summer Olympics.

References

1994 births
Living people
Seychellois male weightlifters
Olympic weightlifters of Seychelles
Weightlifters at the 2016 Summer Olympics
Weightlifters at the 2014 Commonwealth Games
Weightlifters at the 2018 Commonwealth Games
Commonwealth Games competitors for Seychelles
Competitors at the 2019 African Games
African Games competitors for Seychelles
20th-century Seychellois people
21st-century Seychellois people